Elvington railway station served the village of Elvington, North Yorkshire, England from 1913 to 1972 on the Derwent Valley Light Railway.

History 
The station opened on 21 July 1913 on the Derwent Valley Light Railway. It closed to passengers on 1 September 1926 and to freight on 30 September 1972.

References

External links 

Disused railway stations in North Yorkshire
Railway stations in Great Britain opened in 1913
Railway stations in Great Britain closed in 1926
1913 establishments in England
1972 disestablishments in England